Acupalpus is a genus of insect-eating beetle species. Its representatives are found across Europe, Asia, and North America.

Species 
The following species fall within the genus of Acupalpus:

Subgenus Acupalpus
 Species Acupalpus alluaudianus Lorenz, 1998
 Species Acupalpus alumnus Basilewsky, 1946
 Species Acupalpus angulosus Lorenz, 1998
 Species Acupalpus antongilensis Jeannel, 1948
 Species Acupalpus bifossulatus Solier, 1849
 Species Acupalpus brunnipes (Sturm, 1825)
 Species Acupalpus canadensis Casey, 1924
 Species Acupalpus cantabricus (Piochard de la Brûlerie, 1868)
 Species Acupalpus carus (LeConte, 1863)
 Species Acupalpus dimidiatus Brullé, 1838
 Species Acupalpus djemdjemensis Basilewsky, 1948
 Species Acupalpus dubius Schilsky, 1888
 Species Acupalpus egenus Péringuey, 1896
 Species Acupalpus elegans (Dejean, 1829)
 Species Acupalpus erythroderes Blanchard, 1843
 Species Acupalpus exiguus Dejean, 1829
 Species Acupalpus flaviceps (Motschulsky, 1850)
 Species Acupalpus flavicollis (Sturm, 1825)
 Species Acupalpus foveicollis Solier, 1849
 Species Acupalpus gracilis Boheman, 1848
 Species Acupalpus hydropicus (LeConte, 1863)
 Species Acupalpus ibericus Jaeger, 1988
 Species Acupalpus inouyei Habu, 1980
 Species Acupalpus insidiosus Péringuey, 1896
 Species Acupalpus iridens (Motschulsky, 1864)
 Species Acupalpus jaegeri Kataev, 1996
 Species Acupalpus kundelunguensis Basilewsky, 1951
 Species Acupalpus laevicollis G.Müller, 1942
 Species Acupalpus laferi Kataev & Jaeger, 1997
 Species Acupalpus latipennis Jeannel, 1948
 Species Acupalpus latiusculus Basilewsky, 1951
 Species Acupalpus leleupi Basilewsky, 1951
 Species Acupalpus limbatus Gebler, 1833
 Species Acupalpus lucasi (Gaubil, 1849)
 Species Acupalpus luteatus (Duftschmid, 1812)
 Species Acupalpus maculatus (Schaum, 1860)
 Species Acupalpus meridianus (Linnaeus, 1760)
 Species Acupalpus micheli Jeannel, 1948
 Species Acupalpus nanellus Casey, 1914
 Species Acupalpus nigronitidus Blanchard, 1843
 Species Acupalpus notatus Mulsant & Rey, 1861
 Species Acupalpus oliveirae Reitter, 1884
 Species Acupalpus omoxanthus Basilewsky, 1949
 Species Acupalpus orszuliki Wrase & Jaeger, 2017
 Species Acupalpus pallidus Solier, 1849
 Species Acupalpus paludicola Reitter, 1884
 Species Acupalpus parelaphus Vinson, 1935
 Species Acupalpus parvulus (Sturm, 1825)
 Species Acupalpus planicollis (Schaum, 1857)
 Species Acupalpus pumilus Lindroth, 1968
 Species Acupalpus puncticollis (Coquerel, 1859)
 Species Acupalpus punduanus Basilewsky, 1946
 Species Acupalpus ruandanus Basilewsky, 1956
 Species Acupalpus schnitteri Jaeger, 1999
 Species Acupalpus silaceus Dejean, 1831
 Species Acupalpus simplex (Péringuey, 1896)
 Species Acupalpus stricticollis Jeannel, 1948
 Species Acupalpus suturalis Dejean, 1829
 Species Acupalpus tachioides (Sloane, 1900)
 Species Acupalpus testaceipes Blanchard, 1843
 Species Acupalpus turcicus Jaeger, 1992
 Species Acupalpus umbripennis Péringuey, 1896
 Species Acupalpus usambaranus Basilewsky, 1951
 Species Acupalpus ussuriensis Lafer, 1989
 Species Acupalpus vadoni Jeannel, 1948
 Species Acupalpus viduus Dejean, 1829
 Species Acupalpus zaerensis Antoine, 1922
Subgenus Ancylostria
 Species Acupalpus interstitialis Reitter, 1884
 Species Acupalpus mediterraneus Csiki, 1932
 Species Acupalpus morulus Reitter, 1884
Subgenus Setacupalpus
 Species Acupalpus hilaris Tschitscherine, 1899
 Species Acupalpus sobosanus Habu, 1954
Subgenus Stenolophidius
 Species Acupalpus alienus Péringuey, 1908
 Species Acupalpus alluaudi (Jeannel, 1948)
 Species Acupalpus andrewesi Jaeger, 2013
 Species Acupalpus bequaerti Burgeon, 1936
 Species Acupalpus boops J.Sahlberg in Reitter, 1900
 Species Acupalpus borkuanus (Bruneau de Miré, 1990)
 Species Acupalpus brunnicolor (Sloane, 1898)
 Species Acupalpus distincticollis Jaeger, 2013
 Species Acupalpus elaphus Alluaud, 1916
 Species Acupalpus hartmanni Jaeger, 2013
 Species Acupalpus hiekei Jaeger, 2013
 Species Acupalpus inornatus Bates, 1873
 Species Acupalpus leleupi (Basilewsky, 1951)
 Species Acupalpus leroyi (Basilewsky, 1951)
 Species Acupalpus maculipennis Jaeger, 2013
 Species Acupalpus papua Darlington, 1968
 Species Acupalpus posticalis Putzeys, 1880
 Species Acupalpus punctatus (Jedlicka, 1936)
 Species Acupalpus quadrisetosus Jaeger, 2015
 Species Acupalpus rhombotus Andrewes, 1936
 Species Acupalpus seydeli (Basilewsky, 1951)
 Species Acupalpus sinuellus Bates, 1892
 Species Acupalpus terminalis (Chaudoir, 1843)
 Species Acupalpus ustus Andrewes, 1930
 Species Acupalpus villiersi (Basilewsky, 1967)
Subgenus Subacupalpus
 Species Acupalpus gerdmuelleri Jaeger, 2010
 Species Acupalpus sikkimensis Andrewes, 1930
Subgenus Tachistodes
 Species Acupalpus indistinctus Dejean, 1831
 Species Acupalpus partiarius (Say, 1823)
 Species Acupalpus pauperculus Dejean, 1829
 Species Acupalpus testaceus Dejean, 1829

References

External links
 A gallery of Acupalpus beetles on BugGuide.net

 
Carabidae genera
Taxa named by Pierre André Latreille